Otto Ehrenfried Ehlers (31 January 1855 – 3 October 1895) was a German traveller who is known for his account of a long trip through inland Southeast Asia, documented in his 1894 book Im Sattel durch Indochina, and recently republished by White Lotus Press of Thailand in English as a three-part series entitled On Horseback Through Indochina.

Biography
He was born on 31 January 1855 in Hamburg. He died on 3 October 1895 in Kaiser-Wilhelmsland, part of German New Guinea while attempting to cross the island of New Guinea from north to south.

References

German travel writers
1855 births
1895 deaths
Writers from Hamburg
German male non-fiction writers
German explorers